is an autobahn in Germany.

The A 861 opened on 7 March 2006. Its northern terminus with the A 98 is merely a ninety-degree turn accompanied by a designation change. The A 98 will not be completed east of this interchange until 2013. At the southern end of the A 861 is the Rheinfelden border crossing with Switzerland. A small portion of motorway connects this crossing to Switzerland's A 3 at junction 14. Vehicles on this small section of motorway do not need the vignette that is normally required to travel on Swiss motorways. This is to allow German traffic and Swiss traffic that do not have vignettes to cross between the Swiss and German halves of Rheinfelden without having to buy one. A vignette is required to go past the junction Rheinfelden-West, as traffic then must enter the A 3.

The European route E54 is concurrent with the A 861 until junction 2.

Exit list

Germany

 

 
 

|}

Switzerland

|-
| 
| style="text-align:right; padding:0 .5em;" | (14)
| 3-way interchange Verzweigung Rheinfelden 
|}

External links
 Autobahn Atlas: A861


861